Chinese photinia is a common name for several plants and may refer to:

Photinia serratifolia
Stranvaesia davidiana